I80 or variation, may refer to:

 Interstate 80 (I-80), a U.S. highway
 Aérotrain I80, a hovertrain
 Cascade Kasperwing I-80, an ultralight motorglider
 , a WWII British Royal Navy Clemson-class destroyer

See also

 Watt/I-80 station, Sacramento, California
 80i